The .380 Long [9.8 x 24mmR], also known as the .380 Rook rifle, is an obsolete centerfire rifle cartridge.

Overview
The .380 Long is a straight rimmed cartridge originally designed for use in rook rifles for target shooting and hunting game up to the size of smaller deer.
 
In addition to British munitions makers, the .380 Long was also made by DWM in Germany and a number of cheap European pistols were chambered in it.  This cartridge is very similar to the .38 Long Colt and may have inspire the latter cartridge's development. 
 
As with other rook rifle cartridges, the .380 Long was superseded as a small game hunting and target cartridge by the .22 Long Rifle.  As a pistol cartridge, the .380 Long gradually lost favour to more modern rounds such as the .38 S&W.

See also
 Rook rifle
 List of rifle cartridges
 9 mm rifle cartridges

References

Footnotes

Bibliography
 Barnes, Frank C., Cartridges of the World, 15th ed, Gun Digest Books, Iola, 2016, .
 Cartridgecollector, ".300 Rook target", cartridgecollector.net, retrieved 28 April 2017.
 Imperial War Museums, "9.8 x 24R : ; .380 Long Revolver CF & .380 Rook Rifle", iwm.org.uk, retrieved 28 April 2017.

External links
 Ammo-One, ".380 Long rifle", ammo-one.com, retrieved 28 April 2017.
 Cartridgecollector, " 380 Long CF (Rifle)" ", cartridgecollector.net, retrieved 28 April 2017.
 The Spanish Association of Cartridge Collectors, ".380 Long revolver long CF", municion.org , retrieved 28 April 2017.

Pistol and rifle cartridges
British firearm cartridges
Rook rifle cartridges